Amalia Ballarino is a nuclear and superconductor scientist. She currently serves as leader of CERN’s magnets, superconductors, and cryostats group.

Education and career
She earned her master's degree and doctorate in nuclear engineering from the Polytechnic University of Turin, running her doctorate work at CERN, where she has worked since 1997.

She participated in the designing of the Large Hadron Collider between 1998 and 2008. In 2006, she was named Superconductor Industry Person of the Year by Superconductor Week. In 2010, she was named head of CERN’s superconductors group. She was a plenary speaker at EUCAS 2019 in Glasgow. She was elected onto the board of directors for the Applied Superconductivity Conference in 2012. She is a member of Technical Committee TC 90 of the International Electrotechnical Commission, in the tensile test and electro-mechanical properties of composite superconductors working group. 

She has led the design of the electrical transmission lines for the High Luminosity LHC Project, scheduled to come online in 2027, basing it off of superconducting MgB2 electrical transfers. In June 2020, the line broke a world record for electrical intensity, transporting 54 000 amperes across a distance of 60 metres. Her team had previously set a world record of 20 000 amperes in 2014, and patented a method for manufacturer high temperature superconducting tape.

Recognition
In July 2021, she was awarded the James Wong Award from the Institute of Electrical and Electronics Engineers.

References 

Women nuclear physicists
Superconductivity scientists and engineers
People associated with CERN
Polytechnic University of Turin alumni
Living people
Year of birth missing (living people)